Enge is a surname. Notable people with the surname include:

Charles Enge (1869–1945), American politician
Detlef Enge (born 1952), East German footballer
Erik Enge (1852–1933), Norwegian politician
Ivar P. Enge (1922–2013), Norwegian radiologist
James Enge, pseudonym of James M. Pfundstein, American writer
Jonas Enge (1908–1981), Norwegian politician
Ludvig Enge (1878–1953), Norwegian civil servant and politician
Rolv Enge (1921–2014), Norwegian resistance member and architect
Tomáš Enge (born 1976), Czech racing driver